Milutin Vidosavljević (born 21 February 2001) is a Serbian footballer who plays for Radnički Kragujevac, on loan from Čukarički.

Club career
Vidosavljević made his debut for Čukarički on 24 September 2017 in a game against Borac Čačak. He scored his first goal on 19 May 2019, in a 1–1 home draw against Vojvodina.

On 30 July 2021, Vidosavljević moved abroad and joined Levante UD on loan, being initially assigned to the reserves in Segunda División RFEF.

References

External links
 

2001 births
Living people
Serbian footballers
Serbia youth international footballers
FK Čukarički players
Serbian SuperLiga players
Atlético Levante UD players
Association football forwards
Serbia under-21 international footballers
Serbian expatriate footballers
Serbian expatriate sportspeople in Spain
Expatriate footballers in Spain